A Summer Holiday (other English-language titles are No Vacation for Maigret, Maigret on Holiday, and Maigret's Holiday) is a detective novel by Belgian writer Georges Simenon, featuring his character inspector Jules Maigret. The novel was written between November 11 to November 20, 1947, in Tucson, Arizona, United States. The book was published in the following year by Presses de la Cité.

Translations
The book has been translated into English under different titles: in 1950 as A Summer Holiday and in 1953 as No Vacation for Maigret by Geoffrey Sainsbury; in 1970 as Maigret on Holiday by Jacqueline Baldick; in 2016 as Maigret's Holiday  by Ros Schwartz.

The first German translation by Jean Raimond was published by Kiepenheuer & Witsch in 1956. The new translation by Markus Jakob was published by Diogenes Verlag in 1985.

Adaptations
The novel has been adapted several times for cinema and television:

In French
1956: as Maigret en Vacances, starring Henri Norbert as Maigret;
1971: as Maigret en vacances, with Jean Richard in the lead role;
1995: as Les Vacances de Maigret, with Bruno Cremer;

In English
1961: as On Holiday, starring Rupert Davies;

In Dutch
1968: as Maigret met vakantie (Maigret on Holiday), starring Jan Teulings.

Bibliography
Maurice Piron, Michel Lemoine, L'Univers de Simenon, guide des romans et nouvelles (1931–1972) de Georges Simenon, Presses de la Cité, 1983, p. 308-309

External links

Maigret at trussel.com

References

1948 Belgian novels
Maigret novels
Novels set in France
Novels set in the 20th century